Meleonoma is a genus of moths in the family Autostichidae.

Taxonomic history & placement
Meleonoma was established by Edward Meyrick in 1914, who placed the genus in the family Oecophoridae. Subsequently, Clarke (1965) listed the genus in the family Cosmopterigidae. Park & Park (2016) attributed the genus to Lypusidae sensu Lvovsky (2015), although shortly after, Yin & Wang (2016a & 2016b) placed the genus as incertae sedis within Gelechioidea and then in Oecophoridae, followed by Kitajima & Salamaki (2019) when studying the Japanese species. Furthermore, Lvovsky (2015) synonymized the genus Acryptolechia (at that time placed in Cryptolechiinae of Depressariidae) with Meleonoma.  More recently, Wang & Li (2020) studied the molecular phylogeny of Gelechioidea, and found Meleonoma plus Phaulolechia formed a clade constituting the tribe Meleonomini, sister to Periacma + Irepacma + Epiracma, constituting the Periacmini, bringing both tribes together to form the subfamily Periacminae, in Autostichidae.

Most recently, there has been a flurry of publications on the genus:
Yin & Cai (2019) described two new species from Guangxi and Fujian provinces, China; 
Wang et al. (2020) reviewed the genus, retained the placement in Meleonomini (Autostichidae, Periacminae) and provided a global checklist, including transferring 50 species from the moth genus Cryptolechia;
Zhu et al. (2020) described 16 new species from Hainan Island, China; Yin et al. (2020) described three new species from Yunnan province, China; lastly, Wang & Zhu (2020a & 2020b) described a further 36 species from China.

Species
(species groupings follow Wang et al., 2020 and Wang & Zhu (2020a & 2020b)
the malacobyrsa group 
Meleonoma anisodonta Wang & Zhu, 2020
Meleonoma dorsoprojecta (Wang, 2006)
Meleonoma lanceolata Wang & Zhu, 2020
Meleonoma longaedeaga Wang & Zhu, 2020
Meleonoma lunulata Wang & Zhu, 2020
Meleonoma malacobyrsa (Meyrick, 1921)
Meleonoma microbyrsa (Wang, 2003)
Meleonoma papillata Wang & Zhu, 2020
Meleonoma robusta (Wang, 2006)
Meleonoma rugulosa Wang & Zhu, 2020
the segregnatha group
Meleonoma acutata Wang & Zhu, 2020
Meleonoma apicispinata Wang, 2016
Meleonoma acutata Wang & Zhu, 2020
Meleonoma basiprocessa Wang & Zhu, 2020
Meleonoma bicornea Wang & Zhu, 2020
Meleonoma bidigitata Wang & Zhu, 2020
Meleonoma brevicula Park, 2016
Meleonoma circinans Wang & Zhu, 2020
Meleonoma compacta Wang & Zhu, 2020
Meleonoma cuneata Wang & Zhu, 2020
Meleonoma flavifasciana Kitajima & Sakamaki, 2019
Meleonoma flavilineata Kitajima & Sakamaki, 2019
Meleonoma forcipata Wang & Zhu, 2020
Meleonoma infundibularis (Wang, 2006)
Meleonoma ledongensis Wang & Zhu, 2020
Meleonoma liui (Wang, 2006)
Meleonoma longihamata Wang & Zhu, 2020
Meleonoma mecobursoides Wang & Zhu, 2020
Meleonoma microdonta Wang & Zhu, 2020
Meleonoma papillisetosa Wang & Zhu, 2020
Meleonoma parallela Wang & Zhu, 2020
Meleonoma recticostata Wang & Zhu, 2020
Meleonoma rostriformis (Wang, 2006)
Meleonoma segregnatha Wang & Zhu, 2020
Meleonoma taeniophylla Wang & Zhu, 2020
Meleonoma tamraensis Park, 2016
Meleonoma trimaculata (Wang, 2006)
the annulignatha group
Meleonoma artivalva Wang & Zhu, 2020
Meleonoma annulignatha Wang & Zhu, 2020
Meleonoma bifoliolata (Wang, 2006)
Meleonoma sinuicosta Wang & Zhu, 2020
Meleonoma taiwanensis Wang & Zhu, 2020
the fasciptera group
Meleonoma argometra (Meyrick, 1935)
Meleonoma concaviuscula (Wang, 2004)
Meleonoma denticulata (Wang, 2004)
Meleonoma falsitorophanes (Wang, 2006)
Meleonoma kangxianensis (Wang, 2003)
Meleonoma latifascia (Wang, 2004)
Meleonoma muscosa (Wang, 2004)
Meleonoma neargometra (Wang, 2003)
Meleonoma proximideflecta (Wang, 2004)
Meleonoma solifasciaria (Wang, 2004)
Meleonoma spinifera (Wang, 2004)
Meleonoma stictifascia (Wang, 2003)
Meleonoma zeloxantha (Meyrick, 1934)
the jigongshanica group
Meleonoma cornutivalvata (Wang, 2003)
Meleonoma jigongshanica (Wang, 2003)
the dentivalvata group
Meleonoma anthaedeaga (Wang, 2003)
Meleonoma deflecta (Wang, 2003)
Meleonoma falsivespertina (Wang, 2003)
Meleonoma fascirupta (Wang, 2003)
Meleonoma furcellata (Wang, 2004)
Meleonoma gei (Wang, 2003)
Meleonoma luniformis (Wang, 2006)
Meleonoma menglana (Wang, 2006)
Meleonoma paranthaedeaga (Wang, 2003)
Meleonoma proximihamatilis (Wang, 2006)
Meleonoma rectimarginalis (Wang, 2006)
Meleonoma similifloralis (Wang, 2006)
Meleonoma torophanes (Meyrick, 1935)
Meleonoma varifascirupta (Wang, 2003)
Meleonoma zhengi (Wang, 2003)
the facialis group
Meleonoma anticentra (Meyrick, 1910)
Meleonoma aridula (Meyrick, 1910)
Meleonoma bilobata Wang, 2016
Meleonoma catenata Wang & Zhu, 2020
Meleonoma dierli Lvovsky, 2015
Meleonoma dilativalva Wang & Zhu, 2020
Meleonoma dorsibacilliformis Wang & Zhu, 2020
Meleonoma dorsolobulata Wang, 2016
Meleonoma echinata Li, 2004
Meleonoma elongata Wang, 2016
Meleonoma facialis Li & Wang, 2002
Meleonoma facunda (Meyrick, 1910)
Meleonoma fasciculifera (Wang, 2004)
Meleonoma foliata Li, 2004
Meleonoma heterota Meyrick, 1914
Meleonoma japonica Kitajima et Sakamaki, 2019
Meleonoma jubingella Lvovsky, 2015
Meleonoma longiprocessa Wang & Zhu, 2020
Meleonoma malacognatha Li, 2002
Meleonoma margisclerotica Wang, 2016
Meleonoma meyricki Lvovsky, 2015
Meleonoma montana Lvovsky, 2015
Meleonoma nepalella Lvovsky, 2015
Meleonoma nephospora Meyrick, 1930
Meleonoma parvissima Wang & Zhu, 2020
Meleonoma petrota Meyrick, 1914
Meleonoma polychaeta Li, 2004
Meleonoma stomota (Meyrick, 1910)
Meleonoma tianmushana Wang & Zhu, 2020
Meleonoma tenuiuncata Wang & Zhu, 2020
Meleonoma triacantha Wang & Zhu, 2020
Meleonoma triangula Wang, 2016
Meleonoma ventrospinosa Wang & Zhu, 2020
the acutiuscula group
Meleonoma acutiuscula (Wang, 2004)
Meleonoma fustiformis (Wang, 2006)
Meleonoma mirabilis (Wang, 2003)
Meleonoma olivaria (Wang, 2006)
Meleonoma peditata (Wang, 2006)

Species awaiting assignment to existing or as yet undefined groups
Meleonoma bifida (Wang, 2006)
Meleonoma concolora (Wang, 2006)
Meleonoma flavimaculata (Christoph, 1882)
Meleonoma foliiformis Yin, 2019
Meleonoma hamatilis (Wang, 2004)
Meleonoma implexa Meyrick, 1918
Meleonoma leishana (Wang, 2006)
Meleonoma pardalias Meyrick, 1931
Meleonoma projecta Yin, 2019
Meleonoma sticta (Wang, 2006)
Meleonoma vespertina (Meyrick, 1910)
Meleonoma wenxianica (Wang, 2006)
Meleonoma apicicurvata Wang, 2020
Meleonoma apicirectangula Wang, 2020
Meleonoma bicuspidata Wang, 2020
Meleonoma bidentata Wang, 2020
Meleonoma conica Wang, 2020
Meleonoma hainanensis Wang, 2020
Meleonoma latiunca Wang, 2020
Meleonoma linearis Wang, 2020
Meleonoma magnidentata Wang, 2020
Meleonoma ornithorrhyncha Wang, 2020
Meleonoma parilis Wang, 2020
Meleonoma pectinalis Wang, 2020
Meleonoma puncticulata Wang, 2020
Meleonoma quadritaeniata Wang, 2020
Meleonoma robustispina Wang, 2020
Meleonoma rostellata Wang, 2020
Meleonoma plicata Yin, Zhi & Cai, 2020
Meleonoma scalprata Yin, Zhi & Cai, 2020
Meleonoma taeniata Yin, Zhi & Cai, 2020

Species incertae sedis
sensu Wang et al., 2020, i.e. current placement to genus is uncertain and may be revised
Meleonoma capnodyta (Meyrick, 1906)
Meleonoma crocomitra (Meyrick, 1914)
Meleonoma diehlella Viette, 1955
Meleonoma impulsa Meyrick, 1934
Meleonoma psammota Meyrick, 1915

Former species
Meleonoma basanista Meyrick, 1922, a junior synonym of Meioglossa pentochra (Lower, 1894)

References

Bibliography
 Natural History Museum Lepidoptera genus database
Park & Park, 2016. Two new species of the genus Meleonoma Meyrick (Lepidoptera, Lypusidae) from Korea.

Autostichidae
Moth genera